Drepanorhina is a monotypic moth genus of the family Erebidae erected by George Hampson 1926. Its only species, Drepanorhina shelfordi, was first described by Charles Swinhoe in 1904. It is found in Borneo.

References

Calpinae
Monotypic moth genera